Artyom Valeryevich Yenin (born 6 August 1976) is a former association football player.

Honours
 Russian Cup runner-up (2000).

International career
Yenin played his only game for Russia on 23 September 1998 in a friendly against Spain.

Personal life
His son, Yegor Yenin, is also a footballer, and was included on the roster of FC Shinnik Yaroslavl for the 2018–19 season, but has not yet made his professional debut.

References

 Player profile 

1976 births
Living people
Russian footballers
Russia international footballers
FC Shinnik Yaroslavl players
PFC CSKA Moscow players
PFC Spartak Nalchik players
FC Ural Yekaterinburg players
Russian Premier League players
Footballers from Yaroslavl
Association football midfielders
FC Dynamo Vologda players
FC Lukhovitsy players
FC Spartak Kostroma players